Kam Woo-sung (born October 1, 1970) is a South Korean actor. He is best known for his portrayal of a court jester serving a despotic king in the hit period film The King and the Clown.

Career
Kam Woo-sung majored in Oriental painting at the Seoul National University, then made his acting debut in the 1991 television drama Our Paradise. Through his roles on TV in the following decade, Kam became known for playing gentle and intellectual upper-middle-class men, notably in Hyun-jung, I Love You. Then in 2002, he successfully subverted this image in his first film, the critically acclaimed Marriage Is a Crazy Thing, in which he played a commitment-phobic professor having a passionate affair.

More characters followed in a variety of genres: a man trapped in a confusing and haunting sequence of events in Song Il-gon's mystery film Spider Forest; the PTSD-afflicted leader of a South Korean squadron in Vietnam who looks into the mysterious disappearance of 18 soldiers in the horror thriller R-Point; and a son struggling to fake Korea's reunification to fulfill an ailing father's wish in the comedy A Bold Family.

In late 2005, Kam reached a turning point in his 15-year career when he starred in The King and the Clown. Jang Hyuk was originally cast in the leading role of a court jester during the reign of Joseon Dynasty tyrant King Yeonsan, but after Jang was implicated in a draft-dodging scandal, Kam was brought in to replace him. He trained extensively over two months in the art of Korean traditional performance, including street opera, and acrobatic, rope and mask dances. The low-budget film unexpectedly broke box office records to become (at the time) the highest grossing Korean film of all time. Critics praised Kam's "powerful energy and wit," and his performance garnered acting recognition, including Best Actor at the 2006 Grand Bell Awards.

He returned to television in Alone in Love (2006), which was lauded for its realistic portrayal of a divorced couple. Back on the big screen, Kam reunited with previous A Bold Family costar (and close friend in real life) Kim Su-ro in Big Bang (2007), followed by the ensemble romantic comedy My Love and crime thriller The Outlaw (2010). Kam was listed as one of the highest paid entertainers on the KBS network in 2011, earning  for playing Geunchogo of Baekje in the 60-episode series The King of Legend.

Though appearing less frequently in projects, Kam has starred in melodramas My Spring Days (2014), Should We Kiss First? (2018) and The Wind Blows (2019) in recent years.

Personal life
After dating for 15 years, Kam married actress Kang Min-ah in Australia in 2006.

Filmography

Film

Television series

Awards

Album 
 《I Will》- MBC drama "My Spring Days" OST(2014)

References

External links 

Kam Woo-sung at 8D Creative

 
 

People from North Chungcheong Province
South Korean male film actors
South Korean male television actors
1970 births
Living people
Hoesan Gam clan